Robert Terrence "Terry" Bradway is an American football executive. He served as the general manager for the New York Jets of the National Football League (NFL) from 2001 to 2006.  Bradway had worked in the personnel department for the Kansas City Chiefs prior to being hired as general manager of the Jets. . As the Jets GM, the Jets went under an average of .417, winning 41.7% of his games

References

Year of birth missing (living people)
Living people
Kansas City Chiefs executives
National Football League general managers
New York Jets executives
TCNJ Lions football players